Bryan McDaniel Taylor (born March 2, 1976) is an American lawyer and former Alabama state senator. Before returning to private practice in January 2020, Taylor served as general counsel to the governor of Alabama, Kay Ivey.  Taylor also served as policy director and counsel to Gov. Bob Riley before being elected to the Alabama Senate in 2010. Taylor began his legal career as an active duty Army judge advocate and served a combat tour in Iraq. Prior to joining the Ivey Administration, Taylor served as general counsel for the Alabama Department of Finance, the cabinet-level agency responsible for the state's fiscal management and overall administration.

In the 2010 election cycle that saw the Republicans in Alabama win control of the State Legislature for the first time since Reconstruction, Taylor was elected to the Alabama Senate over the seven-term incumbent Wendell Mitchell (D-Luverne), becoming the first Republican ever to represent the 30th District. Taylor is "perhaps best known as the author of Alabama’s new ethics law." Taylor was an advocate for legislative term limits. He decided not to run for re-election in 2014, saying he wanted to "focus on family and [his] private sector career." He is succeeded by Clyde Chambliss (R-Prattville, Ala.).

References 

Republican Party Alabama state senators
People from Pensacola, Florida
Living people
1976 births